Khathing is a Tangkhul Naga surname. Notable people with the surname include:

 Darlando T. Khathing, Indian academic
 Ralengnao Khathing (1912–1990), Indian soldier, civil servant, and diplomat

Surnames of Naga origin
Naga-language surnames